Grangeville High School, is a four-year secondary school in Grangeville, Idaho, operated by the Mountain View School District #244. The school colors are navy blue and white and the mascot is a bulldog.

Athletics
Grangeville competes in athletics in IHSAA Class 2A in the Central Idaho League with Orofino and St. Maries.

State titles
Boys
 Football (2): fall (2A) 2011, 2015  (official with introduction of A-2 playoffs in fall 1978, A-3 in 1977)
 Basketball (2): (A-2, now 3A) 1974, (2A) 2013 
 Baseball (2):  (A-3, now 2A) 1989, 2013 (records not kept by IHSAA, state tourney introduced in 1971, A-2 in 1980, A-3 in 1986)
 Track (4): (A-3, now 2A) 1995, 1997, 1998; (A-2, now 3A) 1999

Girls

 Basketball (8): (A-2, now 3A) 1977, 1979; (A-3, now 2A) 1994, 1996; (2A) 2004, 2005, 2008, 2011 (introduced in 1976) 
 Track (1): (A-3, now 2A) 1996 (introduced in 1971)
 Tennis (0): (4A)  (combined team until 2008)

Combined
 Tennis (0): (introduced in 1963, combined until 2008)-->

Notable graduates
Matt Hill (born 1978), NFL player
Ken Schrom, MLB pitcher (1980–87), class of 1973

References

External links
 
MaxPreps.com – Grangeville Bulldogs
Mountain View School District #244

Public high schools in Idaho
Schools in Idaho County, Idaho
Public middle schools in Idaho